V. P. Ramalingam is an Indian politician and member of the Bharatiya Janata Party. Ramalingam is a member of the Puducherry Legislative Assembly from May 11, 2021, as Nominated by the Central Government of India. He is the brother of the former Congress speaker of Puducherry Legislative Assembly V. P. Sivakolundhu.

References 

Living people
Year of birth missing (living people)
21st-century Indian politicians
People from Puducherry
Bharatiya Janata Party politicians from Puducherry
Indian National Congress politicians from Puducherry
Puducherry MLAs 2021–2026
Puducherry politicians
Nominated members of the Puducherry Legislative Assembly